Meagen Gunemba (born 4 June 1995) is a Papua New Guinean footballer who plays as a forward for Lae FC. She is co-captain of the Papua New Guinea women's national team, together with Yvonne Gabong.

She was originally omitted from the squad for the 2022 OFC women's championship, but was recalled after a public outcry.

International goals

Notes

References

1995 births
Living people
Women's association football forwards
Papua New Guinean women's footballers
Papua New Guinea women's international footballers